The year 1573 in science and technology included many events, some of which are listed here.

Astronomy
 Tycho Brahe publishes De Stella Nova.

Medicine
 Publication of the Chirurgia Magna of Paracelsus, a translation into Latin of his work on surgery, Die grosse Wundartzney (1536), in Basel, allowing its wider dissemination throughout Europe.

Births
 January 10 – Simon Marius, German astronomer who named the Galilean moons of Jupiter (died 1624)
 July 25 – Christoph Scheiner, German astronomer who observed sunspots (died 1650)
 September 28 – Théodore de Mayerne, Swiss-born physician (died 1655)

Deaths
 April 29 – Guillaume Le Testu, French privateer, explorer and cartographer (born c. 1509)
 July 29 – John Caius, English physician and benefactor (born 1510)

References

 
16th century in science
1570s in science